Magliano Nuovo is a southern Italian village and hamlet (frazione) of Magliano Vetere, a municipality in the province of Salerno, Campania. As of 2011, its population was 334.

History
The village was the site of an ancient Goth castle, built in the 6th century, conquered by the Lombards and after by the Normans. During the Middle Ages, it was purchased by the noble houses of Sanseverino, Carafa and Pasca. The site was resettled in 1669, when a fire damaged Magliano and the survivors built a new village there, naming it Magliano Nuovo ("New Magliano"). When, some years later, the original site was rebuilt, it took the name of Magliano Vetere ("Old Magliano").

Geography
Located in the middle of Cilento and transcluded into its national park, Magliano Nuovo lies above a mountain (700 m) between the valleys of the rivers Alento and Calore Lucano, 3 km west of Magliano Vetere. A detached quarter, named Palazzo Soccorso, lies below the old town, at an altitude of 600 m, and spans on the national highway SR 488.

Magliano is 4 km far from Gorga, 5 from Capizzo and Stio, 8 from Monteforte Cilento, 13 from Laurino and Campora, 18 from Felitto and Vallo della Lucania, and 37 from Agropoli.

Main sights
The "Magliano Nuovo - Postiglione" mountain path for trekking lover
The Medieval  Bridge over the river
The Goth Castle, built in the 6th century in the highest point of the village
The Assumption of Mary Church (Santa Maria dell'Assunta)
The "Preta Perciata", an underground mountain pass built in the 11th century connecting the valleys of Alento and Calore

Gallery

See also
Cilentan dialect

References

External links

 Magliano Nuovo on tuttocitta.it
 Territory and environment of Magliano

Frazioni of the Province of Salerno
Localities of Cilento